Birvėta is a river in eastern Lithuania and Belarus (Vitebsk Region). It is a right tributary of Dysna. 

The river starts near the Kirkučiai village, Sirvėta Regional Park, Švenčionys District. It flows north passing through the Kančioginas lake. From there, it flows north and east through the Ignalina District. Up to its confluence with the Erzvėtas lake, the river is known as Kančiogina. Next again flowing east, flows through swampy areas and passes by fishing ponds. After , Birvėta crosses the Belarus–Lithuania border and forms a natural border between the Pastavy and Braslaw Districts. Birvėta's valley is shallow and boggy.

Tributaries: Marūniškė (left), Svyla, Kamoja, Juodupis, Medila (right).

Villages near the river: 
Near Kančiogina: Purvėnai, Kančioginas, Barkuškė, Krikonys, Juodagalviai, Mielagėnai
Near Birvėta: Erzvėtas, Kelpučiai, Kliukai, Kėkštai, Pivorai, Rimaldiškė

References 

Rivers of Lithuania
Rivers of Belarus
Rivers of Vitebsk Region